Grande-Digue (2011 pop.: 2,182) is a community in Kent County, New Brunswick, Canada, near Shediac.

The local service district of Grande-Digue takes its name from the community.

Geography
The community is located in Dundas Parish, on the north-east shoreline of the Shediac Bay.  Grand-Digue is located around the intersection of Grand Digue Rd and Route 530.

History

Following the expulsion of the Acadians in 1755, many Acadians found refuge in Grande-Digue. They did not receive land grants until 1791.

The community is predominantly Acadian, and Acadian French is the most widely spoken language. However, due to the large number of summer tourists and cottagers, English is also spoken by virtually the entire population.

École Grande-Digue is the only school located in Grande-Digue. It is a K-8 school and is part of School District 11. High school students go to Polyvalente Louis-J.-Robichaud in Shediac.

Notable people

 Joël Bourgeois, 3000m steeplechase runner, 2-time competitor at the Olympic Games and gold medalist at the 1999 Pan American Games.

See also
List of communities in New Brunswick
Greater Shediac

References

External links
Grande-Digue community website

Communities in Kent County, New Brunswick
Designated places in New Brunswick
Local service districts of Kent County, New Brunswick